The OFC U-20 Championship 1990 was held in Fiji. It also served as qualification for the intercontinental play-off for the 1991 FIFA World Youth Championship.

Teams
The following teams entered the tournament:

 
  (host)

Matches

Qualification to World Youth Championship
Australia qualified for the 1991 FIFA World Youth Championship by beating Israel in an intercontinental play-off. Matches were played on 6 and 9 March 1991 in Sydney, Australia. Despite both matches being played in the same Australian city, Australia still won on away goals.

|}

External links
Results by RSSSF

OFC U-20 Championship
Under 20
1990
1990 in Fijian sport
1990 in youth association football